Vera Luttenberger (born January 28, 1993), better known as Charlee, is an Austrian electropop singer.

Career
At the age of 14, she signed with Universal and started working on her debut album, This Is Me, which was produced by Hubert Molander. The first single, "Boy Like You", a song co-written by the American pop singer and songwriter Kesha, was released in August 2010.

Charlee participated in the Austrian selection for the Eurovision Song Contest 2011, where she sang the song "Good to Be Bad" (her second single) and finished in eighth place. Later in 2011, she released her third single, "Obvious".

On 29 April 2011, Charlee released her debut album, This Is Me.

She took part in a German casting show called The Voice of Germany, but was eliminated in the "Battles". On 24 December 2011, Charlee released an EP called This Is Now, which could be downloaded for free on her homepage.

Discography

Albums

Extended plays

Singles

References

1993 births
Living people
21st-century Austrian women singers
Austrian pop singers
English-language singers from Austria
Universal Music Group artists
The Voice of Germany